The Istanbul Cevahir Shopping and Entertainment Centre, also known as the Şişli Culture and Trade Centre, is a modern shopping mall located on the Büyükdere Avenue in the Şişli district of Istanbul, Turkey. Opened on 15 October 2005, Istanbul Cevahir was the largest shopping mall in Europe in terms of gross leasable area between 2005 and 2011, and is one of the largest in the world.

Structural specifications
 

Istanbul Cevahir was built on a  land plot at a cost of US$250 million. The six retail floors of the shopping centre house 343 shops (some of which are the first in Turkey to sell certain international brands); 34 fast food restaurants and 14 exclusive restaurants.

Other facilities include; a large stage for shows and other events, 12 cinemas (including a private theatre and a cinema for children), a bowling hall, a small roller coaster and several other entertainment facilities.

The building's  glass roof carries the second biggest clock in the world, with three-metre (10 ft) high digits.

Gallery

See also
List of shopping malls in Istanbul
Some 100 pictures in gallery

References

Shopping malls in Istanbul
Şişli
Shopping malls established in 2005
2005 establishments in Turkey
Minoru Yamasaki buildings
St Martins Property Group
Istanbul Central Business District